Qahsareh (also Romanized as Qahsāreh and Qehsāreh; also known as ‘Alīābād-e Qahsāreh) is a village in Barzavand Rural District, in the Central District of Ardestan County, Isfahan Province, Iran. At the 2006 census, its population was 230, in 96 families.

References 

Populated places in Ardestan County